Tárnok is a village in Pest country, Hungary.

References

Populated places in Pest County